Eugenia Yuan is an American actress and former rhythmic gymnast who has won a Hong Kong Film Award.

Early life 
On January 22, 1976, Yuan was born in Inglewood, Los Angeles county, California. Yuan's mother is Cheng Pei-pei, an actress who is known for being a Shaw Brothers Studio alumnus and the role of Jade Fox in Crouching Tiger, Hidden Dragon. Yuan grew up in San Marino, California.

Career

Gymnastic 
Yuan began her career as a rhythmic gymnast for the U.S. Olympic Team and was ranked #4 in the world. Yuan was a member of the team for about seven years with the U.S. National Rhythmic Gymnastics team.

Entertainment 
Yuan's first screen role was acting alongside her mother in Flying Dragon, Leaping Tiger (2002), a martial arts movie. Yuan co-starred in the 2002 drama Charlotte Sometimes which won the best first feature award at the Independent Spirit Awards. 

Yuan returned to Hong Kong to star in one segment of Three where she was named "Best Newcomer" in the Hong Kong Film Awards.  Hollywood director Doug Liman chose her for the title role of the mockumentary Mail Order Wife, for which she was named as a "Rising Star/Screen Acting Discovery" at the Hamptons International Film Festival.

She was nominated at Hong Kong's Golden Horse Awards for her starring role in 2004's The Eye 2 and had roles in the John Dahl film The Great Raid and the Oscar-winning Memoirs of a Geisha.  The jewelry retailer Me & Ro created a special edition hair ornament inspired by Yuan's character in the movie.

Yuan continues to travel back and forth between Los Angeles, New York City and Hong Kong to take studio, Chinese-language and American independent roles alike including the 2007 Gotham Awards winning film Choking Man.  She also co-stars with Tony Leung Ka Fai in the Kenneth Bi film, The Drummer, and Erica Leerhsen in Slaughter. Most recently she has appeared in the Australian television drama Secret City.

Filmography

References

External links
Eugenia Yuan at AliveNotDead.com
Meniscus Magazine interview with Eugenia Yuan
iFilm 2006 Gotham Awards interview
Detroit News

Eugenia Yuan at Chinesemov.com

1976 births
21st-century Hong Kong actresses
American film actresses
American actresses of Chinese descent
American television actresses
Actresses from Los Angeles
Hong Kong film actresses
Living people
People from San Marino, California
21st-century American women